This table provides a list of scientific, nationwide public opinion polls that were conducted from the 2011 Canadian federal election leading up to the 2015 Canadian federal election, which was held on October 19, 2015. For riding-specific polls see 2015 constituency polls.

Campaign period
Graphical summary

Notes
 In cases when linked poll details distinguish between the margin of error associated with the total sample of respondents (including undecided and non-voters) and that of the subsample of decided/leaning voters, the latter is included in the table. Also not included is the margin of error created by rounding to the nearest whole number or any margin of error from methodological sources. Most online polls—because of their opt-in method of recruiting panellists which results in a non-random sample—cannot have a margin of error. In such cases, shown is what the margin of error would be for a survey using a random probability-based sample of equivalent size.
 Refers to the total sample size, including undecided and non-voters.
 "Telephone" refers to traditional telephone polls conducted by live interviewers; "IVR" refers to automated Interactive Voice Response polls conducted by telephone; "online" refers to polls conducted exclusively over the internet; "telephone/online" refers to polls which combine results from both telephone and online surveys, or for which respondents are initially recruited by telephone and then asked to complete an online survey. "Rolling" polls contain overlapping data from one poll to the next, with the fraction in parentheses indicating the proportion of independent data compared to the previous published poll in the series.
 Identifies polling firms that explicitly apply a "likely voter" turnout adjustment to their top-line results.

Pre-campaign period
Graphical summary

Notes
 In cases when linked poll details distinguish between the margin of error associated with the total sample of respondents (including undecided and non-voters) and that of the subsample of decided/leaning voters, the latter is included in the table. Also not included is the margin of error created by rounding to the nearest whole number or any margin of error from methodological sources. Most online polls—because of their opt-in method of recruiting panellists which results in a non-random sample—cannot have a margin of error. In such cases, shown is what the margin of error would be for a survey using a random probability-based sample of equivalent size.
 Refers to the total sample size, including undecided and non-voters.
 "Telephone" refers to traditional telephone polls conducted by live interviewers; "IVR" refers to automated Interactive Voice Response polls conducted by telephone; "online" refers to polls conducted exclusively over the internet; "telephone/online" refers to polls which combine results from both telephone and online surveys, or for which respondents are initially recruited by telephone and then asked to complete an online survey. "Rolling" polls contain overlapping data from one poll to the next, with the fraction in parentheses indicating the proportion of independent data compared to the previous published poll in the series.

Leadership polls
Aside from conducting the usual opinion surveys on general party preferences, polling firms also survey public opinion on who would make the best Prime Minister:

See also
 Opinion polling in the Canadian federal election, 2015 by constituency
 Opinion polling in the Canadian federal election, 2006
 Opinion polling in the Canadian federal election, 2008
 Opinion polling in the Canadian federal election, 2011

References 

2015
2015 Canadian federal election
Canada